Farmers Manual is an electronic music and visual art group, founded in Vienna in the beginning of the 1990s. The core members of the collective are Mathias Gmachl, Stefan Possert, Oswald Berthold, Gert Brantner, and Nik Gaffney. Part of the very lively Viennese electronic music scene of the 1990s, Farmers Manual were successfully crossing the boundaries between electronic music, live visuals, experimental graphics, and web design for Zeta Industries.

Their CDs, published through avant-garde labels such as Mego, Tray or OR, often contained multimedia content. Their most significant release might be RLA (which stands for "Recent Live Archive"), a DVD released on Mego in 2003, which contains the band's extensive backcatalogue of live concert recordings from 1995 to 2003, compressed in MP3 format - totalling 3 days and 20 hours of audio content and released under a Copyleft licence.

As visual artists, Farmers Manual have been included in numerous international festivals, such as FCMM (Montreal, 1999), Avanto (Helsinki, 2001), Art+Communication (Riga, 2006) .

Selected discography

 (1996) Farmers Manual: No Backup (CD+, Mego 008)
 (1996) Farmers Manual: FM (12", Mego 017)
 (1996) Farmers Manual: Does Not Compute (12", Tray)
 (1997) Farmers Manual: fsck (CD, Tray)
 (1998) Farmers Manual: Explorers_We (CD, OR)
 (2000) CD_Slopper: SaskieWoxi (CD, OR)
 (2001) Gcttcatt: Amperase (CD+, Mego 021)
 (2002) pxp: while(p){print"."," "x$p++} (CD, Wavetrap)
Note: this album, by Farmers Manual member Oswald Berthold, was awarded an Honorary Mention at Ars Electronica 2002.
 (2003) Farmers Manual: RLA (DVD-Video/ROM, Mego 777)
 (2017) Farmers Manual: fmoto (Files, bandcamp)

References

Further reading

External links
Farmers Manual website
Farmers Manual's Recent Live Archive of live recordings and associated paraphernalia.
Farmers Manual catalogue on bandcamp.com
Farmers Manual discography on discogs.com
Farmers Manual biography on mego.at
Recent Live Archive (and various other) on archive.org

Free improvisation
Electroacoustic improvisation
Experimental musical groups
Austrian electronic musicians